was an early to mid-Edo period Japanese samurai, and daimyō.

Biography
Tadamasa was born in Osaka as the second son of Yūki Hideyasu. His childhood name was Toramatsu (虎松) later become Toranosuke (虎之助). In 1607, he was received in audience by his grandfather, Tokugawa Ieyasu and uncle Tokugawa Hidetada. Hidetada took a liking to the boy, and ordered that he be raised in the Tokugawa household by Eishō-in together with Tokugawa Yorinobu. In the same year, he was assigned a fief of 10,000 koku, and became daimyō of Kazusa-Anegasaki Domain.

He was noted for his skill in the martial arts, and accompanied Hidetada during the Siege of Osaka, where he was frustrated that he would not be allowed to participate in the battle due to his youth. He strongly petitioned Hidetada to perform his genpuku ceremony before the start of the Osaka summer campaign, and Hidetada agreed, granting him a kanji from his name and Court rank of Senior Fifth Rank, Lower Grade and the courtesy title was Iyo-no-kami. He subsequently distinguished himself in combat with his prowess with the spear, which later became an heirloom of the Echizen-Matsudaira clan.

As a reward for his actions in battle, he was transferred to Shimotsuma Domain in Hitachi Province (30,000 koku) in 1615, but the following year he replaced the disgraced Matsudaira Tadateru at Matsushiro Domain in Shinano Province (120,000 koku). In 1619 he was transferred again, this time to Takada Domain in Echigo Province (250,000 koku).  In 1623, he replaced his elder brother Matsudaira Tadanao as daimyō  of Fukui Domain (500,000 koku) In 1626 his court rank was raised to Senior Fourth Rank, Lower Grade. In 1634, he accompanied Shōgun Tokugawa Iemitsu to Kyoto, and Fukui Domain reached its peak kokudaka of 505,600 koku.

In 1637, he was disappointed that no order came to lead his troops during the Shimabara Rebellion, so he visited the battle in a private capacity with only twelve retainers. In 1643, he ordered the rebuilding of Mikuni Harbor as the main port of Fukui Domain. He died in 1648 at the domain's residence in Edo. On his death, seven of his senior retainers also committed junshi. His grave is at the temple of Eihei-ji in Fukui.

He had a magnificent upper residence (kamiyashiki) constructed outside Edo Castle.

Family
 Father: Yuki Hideyasu
 Mother: Seiryō-in, daughter Nakagawa Kazushige
 Wives: 
 Asano Hanahime, daughter of Asano Yoshinaga of Wakayama Domain
 Ichihime, daughter of kuge Hirohashi Kuroishi
 Concubines:
 Kōshō-in (Uragami dono)
 Shiraishi dono
 Children:
 Matsudaira Masakatsu (1636-1693) by Shiraishi
 Matsudaira Mitsumichi by Ichihime
 Chōmatsu
 Tokumatsu
 Matsudaira Masachika by Uragami
 Manhime married Matsudaira Tsunataka of Matsue Domain
 Kunihime married Honda Shigeaki of Muraoka Domain later married Asukai Masanao (kuge)
 Senhime married Mōri Tsunahiro of Chōshū Domain
 Furihime married Doi Toshinao of Owa Domain

References
Papinot, Edmond. (1948). Historical and Geographical Dictionary of Japan. New York: Overbeck Co.

External links
 Fukui Domain on "Edo 300 HTML" (3 November 2007) 
  越前松平氏 (Echizen Matsudaira) at ReichsArchiv.jp

References

Shinpan daimyo
1598 births
1645 deaths
Fukui-Matsudaira clan